Bachir Skiredj (26 May 1939 – 28 January 2021) was a Moroccan actor, filmmaker, comedian, and screenwriter. A popular entertainer for decades, he was best known for his role in Mohamed Abderrahman Tazi's À la recherche du mari de ma femme, a box office success.

Controversies 
In a 2014 commercial for real estate agency Addoha, Skiredj was criticized for playing the role of a polygamist seeking to separate his "four punishments", which he refuses to see living under the same roof. The commercial, deemed sexist, was withdrawn after 2M yielded to pressure.

In 2018, two individuals were sentenced to two years in prison after leaking a video of an intoxicated Skiredj insulting the royal family.

Death 
After a long battle with COVID-19, Skiredj died at his Orlando, Florida, home on 28 January 2021, during the COVID-19 pandemic in Florida.

Partial filmography

As director 
 2007: Il était une fois, il était deux fois

As actor 
 1977: Une brèche dans le mur
 1988: Une porte sur le ciel
 1988: Badis
 1993: À la recherche du mari de ma femme (In Search of My Wife's Husband)
 2001: Les Amours de Haj Mokhtar Soldi (The Loves of Haj Mokhtar Soldi)

References

External links 
 

1939 births
2021 deaths
Moroccan film directors
20th-century Moroccan male actors
People from Tangier
Deaths from the COVID-19 pandemic in Florida